Mycobacterium triplex is a species of Mycobacterium.

It is closely related to Mycobacterium genavense.

It causes disease in immunocompromised patients.

References

External links	
Type strain of Mycobacterium triplex at BacDive -  the Bacterial Diversity Metadatabase

triplex
Bacteria described in 1997